Restrepia aspasicensium is a species of orchid occurring from Colombia to northwestern Venezuela.

References

External links 

aspasicensium
Orchids of Colombia
Orchids of Venezuela